Alosa vistonica is a species of shad, a freshwater fish in the family Clupeidae. It is endemic to a single shallow lake, Lake Vistonida in Greece. It is classified as critically endangered (CR) and is threatened by sewage, industrial effluents, destruction of spawning sites by agricultural development and increased salinity following the opening of a canal into the sea. It has been suspected to be extinct already.

Short description
A. vistonica reaches a maximum length of 17 cm (SL). It is distinguished from other members of its genus entering freshwater of the Mediterranean basin by having 78-97 gill rakers and well-developed teeth on the palatine and vomer, especially in juveniles.

See also
 Killarney shad

References

External links
 

vistonica
Endemic fauna of Greece
Freshwater fish of Europe
Xanthi (regional unit)
Critically endangered fish
Critically endangered biota of Europe
Fish described in 1986
Taxonomy articles created by Polbot